Ubaldo Néstor Sacco (Buenos Aires, 28 July 1955  – Mar del Plata, 28 May 1997) was an Argentine boxer who was the Junior Welterweight champion of the world.

Professional career 
Known as "Uby", Sacco turned pro in 1978 and won the World Boxing Association light welterweight title by TKO over Gene Hatcher in 1985. He lost the belt the following year to Patrizio Oliva by decision.

Notable fights

Death 
Sacco died in Mar del Plata, Argentina of meningitis in 1997.

See also 
 List of WBA world champions

External links 
 
 

|-

1955 births
1997 deaths
Deaths from meningitis
Neurological disease deaths in Argentina
Infectious disease deaths in Argentina
Boxers from Buenos Aires
Argentine male boxers
Light-welterweight boxers
World light-welterweight boxing champions